Ricardo Jorge Costa Fazenda (born 4 June 1995 in Oliveira de Azeméis) is a Portuguese footballer who plays for CD Estarreja as a right back.

Football career
On 22 October 2014, Fazenda made his professional debut with Oliveirense in a 2014–15 Segunda Liga match against Marítimo B.

References

External links

Stats and profile at LPFP 

1995 births
Living people
People from Oliveira de Azeméis
Portuguese footballers
Association football defenders
Liga Portugal 2 players
U.D. Oliveirense players
C.D. Estarreja players
Sportspeople from Aveiro District